Lum Zhaveli (born 5 March 1990) is a Kosovan Olympic swimmer. He represented his country at the 2016 Summer Olympics in the Men's 50 metre freestyle event where he ranked at #57 with a time of 24.32 seconds. He did not advance to the semifinals.

Zhaveli graduated from the University of Arizona in Tucson, Arizona with his master's degree in computer science in the spring of 2017.

References

External links
 

1990 births
Living people
Kosovan male freestyle swimmers
Swimmers at the 2016 Summer Olympics
Olympic swimmers of Kosovo